The Return of Medusa, also known as The Return of Medusa: Rings of Medusa II, is a 1991 role-playing video game and strategy video game hybrid developed by X-Ample and published by Starbyte Software for Amiga, Atari ST and PC DOS as a sequel to the 1989 game Rings of Medusa. A planned Commodore 64 version was cancelled.

Gameplay

The game is different from the original as its main component is now a typical first-person perspective dungeon crawl, similar to Dungeon Master. Once the player has escaped the dungeon the game becomes a strategy style, involving visiting various locations where trading can be done in order to finance armies. Alternative ways to accumulate income include attacking enemy gangs, playing roulette at the casino and robbing banks.

Plot
It has been many years since the young Cirion, Crown Prince of Morenor, won what he thought to be the final battle against the wicked queen Medusa and conquered her hellish army. But the very night before the Cirion's coronation, he is confronted by the returning Medusa, who kidnaps his girlfriend and boastfully declares her intent to travel to the far future, where he would be long dead and there would be no-one to stop her from gaining absolute control over his land. In the last moment, Cirion follows Medusa through the portal, emerging 300 years into the future in a modern era.

Cirion is now again alone in the fight against the overwhelming forces of evil. Hie must find thirteen keys to Medusa's lair hidden in the mazes of underground bunkers, and destroy the dark crystal Dohor that is the source of the witch's power to defeat her forever and rescue his beloved.

Reception
The game received generally positive reviews, including the scores of 85% from Amiga Format, 69% from Amiga Action, 90% from Joystick, 82% from Amiga Joker, 70% from Power Play, and 42/50 from ASM.

References

External links
The Return of Medusa at MobyGames
Rings of Medusa II: The Return of Medusa at Lemon Amiga
The Return of Medusa: Rings of Medusa II Amiga at HOL Amiga database

1991 video games
Amiga games
Atari ST games
Cancelled Commodore 64 games
DOS games
Dungeon crawler video games
Role-playing video games
Science fantasy video games
Single-player video games
Video games about time travel
Video games developed in Germany
Video games scored by Jochen Hippel
Video game sequels
Video games about witchcraft
Starbyte Software games